Daqi Station is an elevated metro station in Ningbo, Zhejiang, China. Daqi Station is situated in Daqi Subdistrict. Construction of the station started in December 2012 and it started service on March 19, 2016.

Exits 
Daqi Station has two exits:

References 

Railway stations in Zhejiang
Railway stations in China opened in 2016
Ningbo Rail Transit stations